Memory work is a process of engaging with the past which has both an ethical and historical dimension.

History and memory
The premise for memory work or travail de memoire is that history is not memory. We try to represent the past in the present through memory, history and the archives. As Paul Ricoeur argued, memory alone is fallible. Historical accounts are always partial and potentially misrepresent since historians do not work with bare, uninterpreted facts.  Historians construct and use archives that contain traces of the past. However, historians and librarians determine which traces are preserved and stored. This is an interpretive activity. Historians pose questions to which the archives responds leading them to “facts that can be asserted in singular, discrete propositions that usually include dates, places, proper names, and verbs of action or condition”. Individuals remember events and experiences some of which they share with a collective. Through mutual reconstruction and recounting collective memory is reconstructed. Individuals are born into familial discourse which already provides a backdrop of communal memories against which individual memories are shaped. A group's communal memory becomes its common knowledge which creates a social bond, a sense of belonging and identity. Professional historians attempt to corroborate, correct, or refute collective memory. Memory work then entails adding an ethical component which acknowledges the responsibility towards revisiting distorted histories thereby decreasing the risk of social exclusion and increasing the possibility of social cohesion of at-risk groups.

The concept of memory-work as distinguished from history-as-memory finds a textbook case in the Vichy Syndrome as described by Rousso. His title uses medical lexicon to refer to history-memory as dependent on working consciously with unconscious memories to revise accounts of history. This calls for an expanded archive that includes the "oral and popular tradition" as well as the written traditions normally associated with the archives.

Pierre Nora on memory work
Pierre Nora, introduced 'lieu de mémoire' about 25 years ago, he traced the surge in memory work at the level of the nation-state to the revisiting of distorted histories of the anti-Semitic Vichy France (1940-1944) following the death of Charles de Gaulle in 1970. Structural changes resulted from the end of the peasantry and the dramatic economic slump as oil prices worldwide rose in 1974. Added to this was the intellectual collapse of Marxism precipitated in part by Aleksandr Solzhenitsyn’s Gulag Archipelago which forced the French to rethink attitudes towards the past. 'Lieu de mémoire' closed down perspectives to better understand cultural memory, instead of opening up perspectives. He associated memory with place, and location.

During memory work, the process of producing an image or what we refer to as the production of the imaginary, is central. Therefore, the key in the analysis of remembered history are contradictions.

Jacques Derrida on memory work
After meeting at Yale University in 1966, Jacques Derrida was a colleague and friend of Paul de Man's until de Man's death in 1983. In 1984 Derrida gave three lectures, including one at Yale University on the art of memory. In Memories:for Paul de Man  described the relationship between memory work and deconstruction in this often-cited passage.

Barbara Gabriel on memory work
Barbara Gabriel provided a model for reading the complexities of memory and forgetting by situating unheimlich within the heimlich, in a Freudian 'one within the other structure'. As point of departure Gabriel examined Edgar Reitz's eleven-part West German television series entitled Heimat. Reitz' work was in response to a larger movement in Germany national memory work provoked in part by an American television series entitled the Holocaust followed viewed by millions. As European art in general and German art in particular resurged in the 1960s, artists like Günter Grass and Edgar Reitz captured international attention as they grappled with issues of identity in a divided, post-Holocaust Germany. Gabriel developed  the concept of an impulse towards national memory work in Germany that stemmed from a haunted subject yearning for a lost, far away, nostalgic place, a utopic homeland. "How do we confront that which we have excluded in order to be, whether it is the return of the repressed or the return of the strangers?" In other words, that which we fear as 'other' is within ourselves through our shared humanity. Repressed memories haunt all of us.

Artistic and Activist Memory Work

After attending a memory methodology workshop in Cape Town, South Africa in 2005 on forced removal traumas, Australian performance artist Tanya Heyward, created a performance piece called Site in Melbourne Watch House in 2006. She referred to a burial ground at Prestwich Street, Cape Town, South Africa with three thousand skeletons dating back to Dutch colonization, the largest of its kind in the South Africa.

Post-colonial views
The concept of memory work is part of a sociological imagination from a post-national point of view. Expanding on Norbert Loeffler: The idea of one national history is only acceptable as a question, not as an answer.

Memory work is related to identity work often associated with displaced persons. Some of the most provocative research on memory work has been authored by the Pied-noir, or French colonials in Algeria, who returned to France following the Algerian War. Examples of such thinkers include Jacques Derrida and Hélène Cixous. Another major writer in this field, Julia Kristeva, also moved away from the country of her birth, having emigrated to France from Bulgaria when she was 24.

See also

References

Bibliography
Ricoeur, Paul. (1955) History and Truth. Translated by C. A. Kelbley. Evanston: Northwestern University press. (2nd edition 1965)
Kristeva, Julia. (1982) Powers of Horror. New York: University Press.
Kristeva, Julie. (1983) Nations without Nationalism, trans. L. S. Roudiez (Yale University Press, 1993)

Rousso, Henry. (1991) The Vichy Syndrome: History and Memory in France since 1944. Translated by A. Goldhammer. Cambridge/London: Harvard University Press.
Derrida, Jacques. (1996) Archive Fever. Translated by E. Prenowitz. Chicago: University of Chicago Press
Cixous, Hélene. (1997) Rootprints: Memory and Life Writing: Routledge
Ricoeur, Paul. (2000) La Mémoire, l'Historie, l'Oubli: l'ordre philosophique: Éditions du Seuil.  https://web.archive.org/web/20061009224247/http://www.theology.ie/thinkers/RicoeurMem.htm 
Nora, Pierre. (2002) "The Reasons for the Current Upsurge in Memory." Tr@nsit-Virtuelles Forum.22 Retrieved Access 2002. http://www.eurozine.com/articles/2002-04-19-nora-en.html  
Gabriel, Barbara. (2004) "The Unbearable Strangeness of Being; Edgar Reitz's Heimat and the Ethics of the Unheimlich" in Postmodernism and the Ethical Subject, edited by B. Gabriel and S. Ilcan. Montreal & Kingston: McGill-Queen's University Press.
Haug, Frigga. (2008) "Australian Feminist Studies" in Memory Work. Volume 23, 537-541.
Basu, Laura. (2011) "Memory dispositifs and national identities: The case of Ned Kelly" in Memory Studies Journal: 4(1): 33-41

Memory
Cultural studies
Ethics